Why Try to Change Me Now is a Chinese suspense crime TV series directed by Zhang Dalei. The series is an adaptation of the novel Moses on the Plain by Shuang Xuetao. It stars Dong Zijian, Hai Qing, Qiu Tian and Dong Baoshi. The series aired on iQIYI from January 16 to January 19, 2023. It is the first Chinese language TV series nominated in Berlinale Series section.

Cast and characters
Dong Zijian as Zhuang Shu 
 A rookie police officer, the son of Dongxin Fu and Dezeng Zhuang
Hai Qing as Fu Dongxin
 The mother of Zhuang Shu. Her father, a professor, was beaten to deaf in Cultural Revolution. She loves art and doesn't share the similar interests with her husband Zhuang Dezeng.
Qiu Tian as Li Fei  
 A childhood friend of Zhuang Shu. She shares the similar interests in art with Fu Dongxin. She lost one leg on Christmas Eve, 1996.
Dong Baoshi as Zhuang Dezeng 
 The father of Zhuang Shu. He was a factory colleague of Li Shoulian and became a rich businessman in late 1990s.
Zhang Chen as Zhao Xiaodong 
 A police office, the mentor of Zhuang Shu in police.
Liang Jingdong as Li Shoulian
 The father of Li Fei. He lost job in 1996.
Wang Zheng as Jiang Bufan
 A police captain, the mentor of Zhao Xiaodong. He was dead on Christmas Eve, 1996. 
Zhang Ninghao as Sun Tianfu
 A doctor who runs a small clinic in Chinese medicine, the boyfriend of Li Fei

Episodes

Production 
In December 2021, the series announced the cast crew.

The series was shot in Hohhot, Inner Mongolia. A number of landmarks were involved, such as Hohhot People's Stadium and Qingcheng Park. The filming took more than 70 days.

Release 
On December 18, 2022, the series was officially announced as a part of iQIYI "Light On" series. A teaser trailer mixing 5 Light On series was released on the same day.

On January 10, 2023, its web-distributed license was issued by China National Radio and Television Administration. On January 16, 2023, the series released the first trailer. On the same day, the streaming started on iQIYI .

Awards and nominations

References

External links 
 
 

2023 Chinese television series debuts
Chinese crime television series
Television shows based on Chinese novels
IQIYI original programming
Television series set in 1996
Television series set in 2003
Television shows set in Inner Mongolia
2023 web series debuts